

Northern Transvaal results in the 1991 Currie cup

Statistics

1991 Currie cup log position

1988 - 1991 results summary (including play off matches)

Northern Transvaal
1991